Ngongotahā Valley is a valley formed by the Ngongotahā Stream west of Rotorua, in New Zealand. Springs on the stream were landscaped in 1939 and promoted as Paradise Valley Springs, and the main road into the valley is Paradise Valley Road. 

Mount Ngongotahā has a peak at 757 metres. A gondola / luge ride operates on the side of the mountain. The springs are still operating, and now include a wildlife park.  Another visitor attraction on the slopes of Mount Ngongotahā is the Wingspan National Bird of Prey Centre.  It is a captive breeding facility and visitor centre located in the Ngongotahā Valley. Wingspan undertakes conservation, education and research activities related to birds of prey found in New Zealand, and provides demonstrations of falconry.

The stream is prone to flooding but a joint project by the Bay of Plenty Regional Council and Rotorua Lakes Council to reduce the risk of future floods is ongoing.

Demographics

Ngongotahā Valley had a population of 1,590 at the 2018 New Zealand census, an increase of 180 people (12.8%) since the 2013 census, and an increase of 126 people (8.6%) since the 2006 census. There were 540 households, comprising 795 males and 795 females, giving a sex ratio of 1.0 males per female. The median age was 39.6 years (compared with 37.4 years nationally), with 363 people (22.8%) aged under 15 years, 267 (16.8%) aged 15 to 29, 753 (47.4%) aged 30 to 64, and 207 (13.0%) aged 65 or older.

Ethnicities were 81.1% European/Pākehā, 31.1% Māori, 2.3% Pacific peoples, 2.6% Asian, and 1.9% other ethnicities. People may identify with more than one ethnicity.

The percentage of people born overseas was 10.9, compared with 27.1% nationally.

Although some people chose not to answer the census's question about religious affiliation, 58.7% had no religion, 28.5% were Christian, 1.3% had Māori religious beliefs, 0.2% were Buddhist and 2.1% had other religions.

Of those at least 15 years old, 138 (11.2%) people had a bachelor's or higher degree, and 291 (23.7%) people had no formal qualifications. The median income was $28,100, compared with $31,800 nationally. 150 people (12.2%) earned over $70,000 compared to 17.2% nationally. The employment status of those at least 15 was that 618 (50.4%) people were employed full-time, 198 (16.1%) were part-time, and 57 (4.6%) were unemployed.

References

Rotorua Lakes District
Populated places in the Bay of Plenty Region
Valleys of New Zealand